The 1892 Hampden–Sydney football team represented Hampden–Sydney College during the 1892 college football season.  In the fall of 1892, William Ford Bull brought together the first official football team at Hampden–Sydney. The 1892 team played just one game, falling 0–24 at home to Richmond College.

Schedule

References

Hampden–Sydney
Hampden–Sydney Tigers football seasons
College football winless seasons
Hampden–Sydney Tigers football